Kol language may refer to:

Kol language (Bangladesh)
Kol language (Cameroon)
Kol language (Papua New Guinea)
Kol, a dialect of Cua language (Austroasiatic)

See also
Aka-Kol language
 Munda languages, historically Kolarian languages
 Ho language, a Munda language spoken by Kol tribal communities 
 Kolarian